The Church of St Christopher in Lympsham, Somerset, England dates from the 15th century, and has been designated as a Grade I listed building.

It is known that Bartholomew de England was appointed rector at Lympsham in 1274, although the parish had been given by Ine of Wessex to Glastonbury Abbey in 690 remaining part of the Abbey estates until the dissolution of the monasteries in 1539.

During the 19th century extensive restoration was carried out by Rev A. J. Stephenson and his son, J. H. Stephenson. Further refurbishment was undertaken in 1909.

Archaeological exploration in 2001 uncovered a copper alloy coin from Bath dated 1670.

The parish is part of the benefice of Brent Knoll, East Brent and Lympsham, within the deanery of Axbridge.

See also

 List of Grade I listed buildings in Sedgemoor
 List of towers in Somerset
 List of ecclesiastical parishes in the Diocese of Bath and Wells

References

15th-century church buildings in England
Church of England church buildings in Sedgemoor
Grade I listed churches in Somerset
Grade I listed buildings in Sedgemoor